Homorod is a commune in Brașov County, Transylvania, Romania. It is composed of three villages: Homorod, Jimbor (Sommerburg; Székelyzsombor), and Mercheașa (Streitfort; Mirkvásár).

The commune is located in the northern part of the county, on the border with Harghita County,  from the county seat, Brașov. It lies on the banks of the Homorod River, at the confluence of the Homorodul Mare and Homorodul Mic.

Demographics
At the 2011 census, 49.3% of inhabitants were Romanians, 29.9% Hungarians, 18.4% Roma, and 1.2% Germans. At the 2002 census, 64.6% were Romanian Orthodox, 11.8% Evangelical Lutheran, 8.3% Roman Catholic, 6.5% Unitarian, 2.8% Reformed, 2.3% belonged to another religion, and 1.5% Evangelical of Augustan Confession.

Natives
József Nyírő

Gallery

See also 
 List of castles in Romania
 Tourism in Romania
 Villages with fortified churches in Transylvania

References

Communes in Brașov County
Localities in Transylvania